The River is a 1938 short documentary film which shows the importance of the Mississippi River to the United States, and how farming and timber practices had caused topsoil to be swept down the river and into the Gulf of Mexico, leading to catastrophic floods and impoverishing farmers. It ends by briefly describing how the Tennessee Valley Authority project was beginning to reverse these problems.

It was written and directed by Pare Lorentz and, like Lorentz's earlier 1936 documentary The Plow That Broke the Plains, was selected for preservation in the United States National Film Registry by the Library of Congress as being "culturally, historically, or aesthetically significant", going into the registry in 1990. The film won the "best documentary" category at the 1938 Venice International Film Festival.

Both films have notable scores by Virgil Thomson that are still heard as concert suites, featuring an adaptation of the hymn "How Firm a Foundation". The film was narrated by the American baritone Thomas Hardie Chalmers.  Thomson's score was heavily adapted from his own concert work Symphony on a Hymn Tune.  The River later served as the score for the 1983 TV movie The Day After.

The two films were sponsored by the U.S. government and specifically the Resettlement Administration (RA) to raise awareness about the New Deal. The RA was folded into the Farm Security Administration in 1937, so The River was officially an FSA production.

There is also a companion book, The River. The text was nominated for the Pulitzer Prize in poetry in that year.

See also
 The Plow That Broke the Plains
 Farm Security Administration

Notes

External links
The River essay  by Dr. Robert J. Snyder at National Film Registry

  (part 2) (missing part 3)
 Pare Lorentz
 The River
 The River review
  posted by the FDR Presidential Library and Pare Lorentz center
 , a better copy, posted by PublicResourceOrg
 The River essay by Daniel Eagan in America's Film Legacy: The Authoritative Guide to the Landmark Movies in the National Film Registry, A&C Black, 2010 , pages 266-268 

United States National Film Registry films
American black-and-white films
1930s short documentary films
Films directed by Pare Lorentz
Documentary films about agriculture in the United States
Documentary films about disasters
American short documentary films
Black-and-white documentary films
Works about the Dust Bowl
1938 documentary films
1938 films
1930s American films